Janelle Lawson (born 9 August 1987) is an Australian netball player. In 2012 she was a member of the Northern Thunder team that won the Netball Superleague title. During the Commonwealth Bank Trophy era she played for Perth Orioles and AIS Canberra Darters.  
During the ANZ Championship era she played for Queensland Firebirds and West Coast Fever.

Playing career

Commonwealth Bank Trophy
In 2005 Lawson played for her home town team, Perth Orioles, in the Commonwealth Bank Trophy. Between 2006 and 2007 she played for AIS Canberra Darters.

ANZ Championship
In 2008 and 2009, Lawson played for Queensland Firebirds in the ANZ Championship. During 2010 she played for West Coast Fever.

Netball Superleague
In 2012 Lawson was a member of the Northern Thunder team that won the Netball Superleague title. In the grand final she scored 33 goals as they defeated Surrey Storm by 57–55. She also played for Thunder, now Manchester Thunder during the 2013 season, helping them reach the semi-final stage.

Victoria
Since 2015 Lawson has played in state and local leagues in Victoria, Australia. In 2015 she played for Monash University Storm and in 2016 she played for ACU Sovereigns. Both teams played in the Victorian Netball League. In 2018 she played for Southern Mallee Giants of the Wimmera Netball Association.

National team
Lawson represented Australia at under-17 and under-21 levels.

Honours
Northern Thunder
Netball Superleague
Winners: 2012

References

1987 births
Living people
Australian netball players
Perth Orioles players
AIS Canberra Darters players
Queensland Firebirds players
West Coast Fever players
ANZ Championship players
Manchester Thunder players
Netball Superleague players
Sportspeople from Perth, Western Australia
Netball players from Western Australia
Australian expatriate netball people in England
Victorian Netball League players